Georgii Pobedonosets ( Saint George the Victorious) was a battleship built for the Imperial Russian Navy, the fourth and final ship of the . She was, however, only a half-sister to the others as her armor scheme was different and she was built much later than the earlier ships. She participated in the pursuit of the mutinous battleship  in June 1905, but her crew mutinied themselves. However, loyal crew members regained control of the ship the next day and they ran her aground when Potemkin threatened to fire on her if she left Odessa harbor. She was relegated to second-line duties in 1908. She fired on  during her bombardment of Sevastopol in 1914, but spent most of the war serving as a headquarters ship in Sevastopol. She was captured by both sides during the Russian Civil War, but ended up being towed to Bizerte by the fleeing White Russians where she was eventually scrapped.

Design and development

Georgii Pobedonosets was originally intended as a version of  rearmed with three  and four  guns, but this changed when the decision was made to provide her with three twin 12-inch turrets rather than the barbettes used by her sisters. The turrets were significantly heavier than the barbette mountings so the armour scheme was revised in compensation. However this revised design was still deemed overweight and rejected. The Naval Ministry held a competition for a replacement, but these were rejected by the Naval Technical Committee in turn. So a modified version of Sinop, with barbettes, was chosen again as the most readily available choice. The height of her armour was lowered to reduce the overweight condition of her half-sisters. Other changes were made while building, but they came early in the process and did not seriously delay her completion past her contractual date of 13 September 1893. These changes included smaller mountings for her main guns that eliminated the sponsons needed in her sisters for the forward barbettes, the substitution of 35-calibre guns for the older 30-calibre guns and steel armor imported from Schnider et Cie of France replaced the compound armour used in her half-sisters.

She had two 3-cylinder vertical triple expansion steam engines driving screw propellers  in diameter. Sixteen cylindrical boilers provided steam to the engines. The engines and boilers were both imported from Maudslay and Sons of the United Kingdom and were  overweight.

Her main armament consisted of three pairs of  Obukhov Model 1886 35-calibre guns mounted in two twin barbette mounts side by side forward and one aft of the superstructure. They had a maximum elevation of 15° and could depress to −2°. Each of the forward mounts could traverse 30° across the bow and 35° abaft the beam, or a total of 155°. The rear mount could traverse 202°. Their rate of fire was one round every four minutes, fifty seconds, including training time. They also had a 'heavy' shell available that weighed  that was fired at a velocity of  although the range is not available.

The seven  35-calibre guns were mounted on broadside pivot mounts in hull embrasures, except for one gun mounted in the stern in the hull. The eight  single-barrelled Hotchkiss guns were mounted on the battery deck to defend the ship against torpedo boats. Ten  Hotchkiss guns were mounted in the fighting top. She carried seven above-water  torpedo tubes, three tubes on each broadside and a tube in the stern.

In contrast to her half-sisters the armour used on Georgii Pobedonosets was steel.

Service history
Georgii Pobedonosets was named after Saint George the Victorious. She was built by the Russian Steam Navigation Company (RoPIT) at Sevastopol. She was laid down on 5 May 1891, launched on 9 March 1892, and completed in 1893, although her trials lasted until mid-1895. She spent her career in the Black Sea Fleet. She began her trials in September 1893, but they were not completed until the middle of 1895.

In 1905, Georgii Pobedonosets briefly joined the Potemkin mutiny. The next day the fleet approached Potemkin, then suddenly retreated. She then followed them, deliberately goading the officers to order the sailors to fire on their comrades. The crew of Georgii Pobedonosets refused: "We won't fire! We won't man the guns! We refuse to engage the Potemkin." Her sailors cheered the rebel sailors' bravery. Dorofey Koshuba, a member of the revolutionary sailors' organisation Tsentralka, broke into the armoury, ordered Captain Ilya Guzevich to halt the ship, pushing him away when he refused. The ship halted, Guzevich pleaded with the sailors to go to Sevastopol, even offering to let the 70 revolutionaries onto Potemkin. Afanasi Matushenko, the leader of Potemkins crew, arrived with several revolutionaries who made a speech that inspired the sailors to arrest the officers. This was enough to make his second-in-command, Lieutenant Grigorkov, commit suicide. Apart from this, the seizure was bloodless. The sailors elected a committee (Koshuba and nine others), locked the officers in the stateroom and ripped off their epaulettes. The officers were put ashore in Odessa. It was decided that the petty officers should be put ashore too the next day. Senior Boatswain A. O. Kuzmenko became captain.

The next day, however, loyal crew members regained control of the ship and they ran her aground and surrendered to the authorities. In August 1905, 75 mutineers were tried. Koshuba and two others were executed and 19 sailors got 185 years of hard labour.

In 1907, the Naval General Staff made a proposal for a radical reconstruction that was similar to the proposals to reconstruct  and  made before the Russo-Japanese War that involved cutting her down by one deck and replacing her armament with two twin-gun turrets equipped with 12-inch 40-calibre guns and the compound armor replaced by Krupp armor. This new proposal differed from the older one in that eight  guns replaced the ten six-inch guns originally planned. This was rejected as she still would have lacked the speed to stay with the main fleet and the hull protection required to withstand high-explosive shell fire.

She became a training ship in 1908 and her 6-inch 35-calibre guns were replaced by modern 6-inch 45-calibre guns. She was modified as a harbour guard ship in 1911 and her 12-inch guns were removed. Six more six-inch guns were added for a total of fourteen. She fired three rounds, missing each time, at the German battlecruiser  during her bombardment of Sevastopol on 29 October 1914, but spent the bulk of World War I as a static headquarters ship in Sevastopol. After the Russian Revolution, she joined the Red Black Sea Fleet in December 1917. She was captured by the Germans in 1918 in Sevastopol and was handed over to the Allies in December 1918. The British sabotaged her engines on 25 April 1919. She was captured by both sides in the Russian Civil War, but eventually became part of Wrangel's fleet and was towed to Bizerte in 1920. She was sold for scrap between 1930 and 1936.

Notes

Footnotes

Bibliography

External links

ship history on Black Sea Fleet 
short history with photos on Navsource.narod.ru 

Battleships of Russia
1892 ships
Battleships of the Imperial Russian Navy
Wrangel's fleet
Ships built at Sevastopol Shipyard
Potemkin mutiny